In Mathematics, the Mashreghi–Ransford inequality is a bound on the growth rate of certain sequences.  It is named after J. Mashreghi and T. Ransford.

Let  be a sequence of complex numbers, and let

 

and

 

Here the binomial coefficients are defined by

 

Then Mashreghi-Ransford showed that

where  Moreover, there is a universal constant  such that

However, it is known that

References

 .

Inequalities